History: Alisa Mizuki Complete Single Collection is the fourth compilation album by Japanese recording artist Alisa Mizuki, released through Avex Tune on March 10, 2004. The dual-disc set comprises all of Mizuki's singles, from 1991 to 2004, as well as the two singles released under different aliases. The album included one new track, "Sky," produced by Incognito's Jean-Paul 'Bluey' Maunick. The lyrics to "Sky" were written by Mizuki herself, making it the first song she wrote by herself entirely. History: Alisa Mizuki Complete Single Collection yielded six original singles, "Break All Day!," "Megami no Mai," "Hitomi no Chikara," "Vacation," "Love Potion" and "Shout It Out," released in a span of four years.

Disc one includes all the singles released through Nippon Columbia, while disc two contains all of Mizuki's singles released through Avex Tune. "Oh Darling" and "Vacation" were included on disc two as bonus tracks. An A6-size reprint of the first issue of Mizuki's fanclub bulletin, Lovers Magazine, as well as liner notes were included with the release. The first pressing of the compilation included an entry form to win tickets to a premium Alisa Mizuki concert.

History: Alisa Mizuki Complete Single Collection debuted at number 25 on the Oricon Weekly Albums chart with 8,527 copies in its first week, making it Mizuki's first album in over seven years to enter the top thirty, since Arisa's Favorite: T.K. Songs, as well as being her last to do so.

History: Alisa Mizuki Complete Single Collection is Mizuki's first and only album to be issued in CCCD format.

Commercial performance 
History: Alisa Mizuki Complete Single Collection debuted on the Oricon Weekly Albums chart at number 25 with 8,527 copies sold in its first week. The album charted for four weeks and has sold a total of 13,746 copies.

Track listing

Charts and sales

References 

2004 greatest hits albums
Alisa Mizuki albums
Avex Group compilation albums
Japanese-language albums